Frederick C. Colborne (November 14, 1916 – April 19, 2006) D.F.C., of Calgary, Alberta, Canada, was elected to the Legislative Assembly of Alberta in 1944 and served until 1971.

Early life
He served in Newfoundland during WWII, earning a Distinguished Flying Cross.

Political career
In 1944, there were 3 members of the armed forces (army, navy, and air force) elected to the Legislature. These three members did not represent a specific constituency but instead spoke for the men and women serving overseas in the Second World War. These 3 representatives had no political affiliation and sat on the opposition side of the House. Colborne was the representative of the Air Force.

He served on Calgary city council 1947–1948.

In 1948, he was elected in the Calgary electoral district as a member of the Alberta Social Credit Party. During his lengthy service as an MLA, he also became a member of Cabinet, serving initially as a Minister without Portfolio. In 1962, he became Minister of Public Works and then, in 1967, Minister of Municipal Affairs. He was defeated in Calgary Currie in the 1971 Alberta general election by Fred Peacock of the Progressive Conservatives. After his defeat from the Legislature he did not return to provincial politics.

References

External links
Legislative Assembly of Alberta Members Listing

Frederick Colborne death notice Legislative Assembly of Alberta Hansard April 24, 2006

1916 births
2006 deaths
Independent Alberta MLAs
Alberta Social Credit Party MLAs
Members of the Executive Council of Alberta
Royal Canadian Air Force personnel of World War II
Royal Canadian Air Force officers
Recipients of the Distinguished Flying Cross (United Kingdom)